Radical 211 meaning "teeth" is the only one of the 214  Kangxi radicals that is composed of 15 strokes.

In the Kangxi Dictionary there are only 21 characters (out of 40 000) to be found under this radical.

Characters with Radical 211

Literature 

Leyi Li: "Tracing the Roots of Chinese Characters: 500 Cases". Beijing 1993,

External links 
Unihan Database – U+9F52
齒 radical - Chinese Text Project Ancient forms of the character and list of Unicode characters with the radical.

211